The 1950 Tulsa Golden Hurricane football team represented the University of Tulsa during the 1950 college football season. In their fifth year under head coach Buddy Brothers, the Golden Hurricane compiled a 9–1–1 record (3–0–1 against Missouri Valley Conference opponents) and was ranked No. 18 in the final AP Poll. The team won victories over Oklahoma A&M (27-13), Texas Tech (39-7), Arkansas (28-13), and Houston (28-21), lost to the San Francisco Dons (14-23), and tied Detroit (13-13).

Schedule

References

Tulsa
Tulsa Golden Hurricane football seasons
Missouri Valley Conference football champion seasons
Tulsa Golden Hurricane football